The Kindaichi Case Files is a Japanese mystery manga authored by Yōzaburō Kanari (earlier series) and Seimaru Amagi (later series) and illustrated by Fumiya Satō. The first two series (File and Case series) were serialized in Kodansha's Weekly Shōnen Magazine from 1992 to 2000. The New series, which was serialized in Weekly Shōnen Magazine between 2004 and 2011, was published at irregular intervals. The regular serialization resumed in 2012 to celebrate the 20th anniversary. A spin-off manga titled , which centred on the primary antagonist Yoichi Takato, was serialized in the webcomic mobile app Manga Box between December 4, 2013, and March 26, 2014. One tankōbon volume of Takato Case Files was released in Japan on May 9, 2014. Another spin-off manga titled  started serialization in the June 2014 issue of Magazine Special and it is illustrated by Yūki Satō.

The entire series is divided into  (27 volumes),  (10 volumes),  (6 volumes),  (2 volumes),  (14 volumes),  (5 volumes), The Kindaichi Case Files R (Returns) (8 volumes) and spin-off series (1 volume). As of January 15, 2016, 73 volumes in total have been released in Japan.

A manga omake titled  is only included as a bonus feature in The Kindaichi Case Files DVD Collectors Box which was released in Japan in 2007.

In 1995, the manga received the 19th Kodansha Manga Award (shōnen section). The series is licensed for an English language release in North America by Tokyopop. The English volumes are published under separate titles which are different from the original Japanese titles. The chapters contained in the English volumes are also different from the Japanese counterparts. While many of the original Japanese volumes contain two mysteries in one book, the chapters in each English volume form a single mystery story and different mysteries are published in separate volumes. Various bilingual (Japanese-English) volumes have been released.

Volume list

File series (27 volumes/19 files)

Case series (10 volumes/7 files)

Short File series (6 volumes/20 short files)

Akechi File series (2 volumes/7 Akechi files)

New series (14 volumes/8 files/6 short files)

20th Anniversary series (5 volumes/3 files/1 short file)

The Kindaichi Case Files R (Returns) (14 volumes/10 files/1 short file/2 Akechi files)

The Akechi Files (5 volumes/8 Akechi files)

37 Year Old Kindaichi (13 Volumes/7 Files)

30th Anniversary series (3 volumes/2 files)

Takato Case Files  (1 volume/7 Takato cases)

Chapters not yet in tankōbon format

30th Anniversary

Case summaries

The main titles
The titles have more or less a literal translation. As of May 2008, Tokyopop has canceled the series. The volume that would have been released next, had it been continued, is Volume #18 "The Burial Francs".

These titles, as well as some details, may be changed by Tokyopop if it releases these volumes in the future.

FILE series

 The Opera House Murders is the first Kindaichi mystery, and the story on which the first anime movie is based. Miyuki corrals Kindaichi into assisting the school drama club in rehearsing The Phantom of the Opera at an isolated island hotel. But a killer stalks the high school group, one who can walk across mud without leaving footprints, and it's up to Kindaichi to solve the case, fighting time, weather, and Police Inspector Kenmochi, who fails to take the young man seriously (for the last time).
 The Mummy's Curse sees Kindaichi and Miyuki visit a classmate about to get married, accompanied by a teacher, who was a boyfriend of the bride. The small hexagram-shaped village in which the classmate lives is packed with wealthy aristocrats who keep mysterious, cut-up mummies in their luxurious homes. But things turn serious when a murder is committed in a locked chapel, and the aristocrats start dying one by one. For Kindaichi, this case is more than the mummies' curse. After finding a connection between the victims and the tragic accident involving the burned church 27 years ago, Kindaichi finally reveals the murderer and the village's dark past!
 Death TV follows Kindaichi and Kenmochi as they assist in the production of Shock TV, a prank-pulling reality show. Fun turns to fright when one of the show's victims is slaughtered by someone dressed up as a legendary snow demon called the "Yukiyasha", while the crew (including pop star Reika Hayami) watches in horror via TV broadcast. The trouble is, how was the murder committed when all the suspects were a twenty-minute drive away from the crime scene?
 Smoke and Mirrors hits Kindaichi's high school when he and Miyuki are asked to join the school's Mystery Club and attempt to track down a series of urban legends called "The Seven Mysteries of Fudo High."  It seems the school has been receiving threatening letters from someone who calls himself "The Afterschool Magician" stating that his home in the old campus area must not be destroyed. But the school's legendary bogeyman turns out to be all too real, a shadowy figure who is able to make himself, and the corpse of one of Kindaichi's classmates, vanish in less than two minutes from a locked room. With Miyuki nearly killed, this case may be too much for Hajime Kindaichi...
 Treasure Isle is rumored to hide a vast bounty of gold said to be guarded by the legendary beast "Yamawara", which Kindaichi and other treasure hunters gather to search for. But the host is killed before the group even arrives, and a bloody slaying takes place during a time in which none of the people on the island could have done it. Will the island's mythical monster-guardian claim more victims?
 The Legend of Lake Hiren involves a legend about a pair of lovers who drowned themselves in a lake, but the lake itself now houses an exclusive resort whose shares could be worth millions. Kindaichi and Miyuki join a focus group evaluating the resort. But the group is soon stalked by an escaped killer who fashioned his slaying after those of Jason Voorhees, and wouldn't you know it, the only bridge to civilization has been cut off...
The Santa Slayings revolve around an exclusive hotel and one of its most unusual guests, a red-bearded man whose dress resembles that of Santa Claus. His very mythos is a shadow hanging over a prominent acting guild staying at the hotel, putting on a murder mystery weekend game. But the murders turn all too real, and Kindaichi becomes personally involved when one of his friends becomes a victim, and the only other person found in the locked room... is him!
 No Noose is Good Noose, or so they say at an exclusive college prep school that Kindaichi is conned into attending by his mother. But the high-pressure school is known for driving its students to suicide by hanging. It's in this atmosphere that a teacher begs Kindaichi's help in finding a mysterious vandal who seems to be targeting her. But the vandal soon graduates to murder, and seems to have the ability to evaporate from locked rooms. Can Kindaichi make the grade?
 The Headless Samurai is a legend in a small town, warning of betrayal and blood. A childhood friend of Kenmochi asks him for help when this myth comes to life and begins threatening her. Then a mysterious stranger is killed in a sealed room, and Kindaichi has to deal with headless corpses, greedy heirs, and an entire village too scared to talk.
 Kindaichi the Killer!? (In the American series this book is found split into both books 10 and 11, changing the number order of the books following.) Kindaichi is invited by an old acquaintance to help his publishing editor acquire the rights to a new book by a famous writer. The eccentric, arrogant author throws a code breaking contest at his villa to determine the lucky recipient. Unfortunately, the writer is murdered, and it's impossible for anyone to have committed the crime except one person: Hajime Kindaichi!  Soon Kindaichi is in a race against the police and the killer to break the code and clear his name.
 Playing the Fool is something Kindaichi is loath to do, especially when it comes to women. Pop star Reika Hayami invites Kindaichi and Miyuki to the Tarot Lodge, high in the snowy mountains, which immediately sets off a rivalry between the two women. Joining them is a motley crew including Reika's manager, a lost skier, and an obsessed fan. But the weekend turns tragic when Reika's father's darkest secret threatens to reveal itself, and terrifying murders occur. Can Kindaichi protect Reika, and figure out how a killer slipped in and out of a room under constant observation?
 The House of Wax is holding a murder mystery weekend, which Kindaichi and Miyuki are invited to by Superintendent Akechi. There they find numerous wax figures, including replicas of each participant. However, they soon find out that this is more than a mere game: the mysterious host, "Mr. Redrum," uses the wax figures to show a murder scene before actually killing the victim with the same method under seemingly impossible circumstances. Now Kindaichi must find the host that calls himself a murderer before the body count rises.
 The Gentleman Thief is a famous thief who steals famous artworks, as well as their "themes", by destroying or mutilating the object featured in the artwork. However, it seems that this time he has gone too far, by killing the father of one of Kindaichi's friends. But solving this case will be difficult, since all the suspects apparently have perfect alibis...
 Graveyard Isle is one of the remnants of the US's island hopping in World War II, where Japanese soldiers committed harakiri. Not exactly the place Kindaichi and his friends wanted to spend a week's vacation, especially with a group of college wargamers. But all too soon, they have violent death to deal with, including a murder that could only have been committed by a ghost...
 The Magical Express is where the mystery starts, a train that runs between Tokyo and a remote town, featuring magic shows put on by a group of prominent magicians. Drawn there by a threat by the mysterious "Puppetmaster," Kindaichi, Miyuki, Kenmochi, and Ryuji Saki witness a corpse vanish from a locked cabin. The murders continue at an isolated hotel, and the detectives are faced with serious questions. Who is the "Puppetmaster"? And what's his relation to the late head of the magic troupe, Reiko Chikayama? Was Reiko's death really an accident?
 The Undying Butterflies are no beautiful insects, but a harbinger of disease and death. Kindachi and Miyuki infiltrate the estate of a wealthy butterfly collector in pursuit of a killer from the past who should be dead. But then people start dying, pinned like butterflies, murdered when no one could possibly have done it. Has the resurrected killer started another bloody rampage?  Or is there something more sinister afoot?
 Burial Francs is a burial practice in a small French village, where a franc is buried with the dead. For one of Kindaichi's childhood schoolmates, however, it was an omen of death for her and her colleagues! Amidst trying to enjoy the bridal competition show and to protect the innocent lives from getting involved, will Kindaichi figure out this "Burial Francs" who is killing off people one by one? What's his connection to Kindaichi's friend?
 The Devil's Artifacts is the nickname given to four artifacts that were said to be cursed — but Kindaichi, who was hired to dig them up, didn't believe in the old tale... until people started dying because of it. Now, with people's lives (and his salary!) at stake, Kindaichi must find out the identity of the artifacts' "guardian" and where they are hidden.
 Reika's Kidnapping is exactly what it sounds like, the kidnapping of pop idol and Kindaichi's friend, Reika Hayami. After escaping from a villa, she claims that her kidnapper was a clown. Kindaichi soon deduces that the mystery clown has to be one of the crew working the movie Reika was appearing in. But which?

CASE series

 Forest of Cerberus: Kindaichi and the group of friends visit the Forest of Cerberus to hunt mushrooms. Things start going wrong when their villa is burnt down, and they are forced to take refuge in an abandoned hospital with a group of medical students. Remnants of test animals, including a cage marked Cerberus, still remain there... Not to mention rabies-infested dogs stalking the halls, and a shadow that resembles the Cerberus of legend. Then the medical students begin dying one by one, their deaths accompanied by vicious claw marks! Is the ancient Greek guardian of the underworld the killer? Will it matter if Kindaichi can't get himself and his friends out alive?
 The Murderer From Screen: The head of the movie club at Fudo High, grandson of Japan's king of cinema, offers Miyuki a starring role in his latest project. But when the other participants start dying, the crew notices a resemblance between their deaths and scenes from the club's previous film, Scorpion. The case seems solved when the director apparently kills himself, clutching the only keys to not one, but TWO locked doors separating him and the suspects. But Kindaichi isn't so sure the case is closed. Who is making life imitate art?
 Divine Treasure of Kotousu is a long lost treasure belonged to Catholics in ancient Japan, guarded by a White Hair Ghost. Not caring much about the legend, Kindaichi — who desperately needed the money and by invitation — went to Kotousu to hunt for the treasure. However, the treasure hunters start dying, one during a time when all the hunters have rock-solid alibis! Will Kindaichi be able to find the murderer, and get some money for himself too?
 Ghost of Yukikage Village: One of his childhood friends has died in the remote Yukikage village, so Kindaichi goes to pay his final respects. However, the death isn't all it appears to be, and soon more of Kindaichi's friends are dropping dead. Who is the killer, and what does the original death have to do with these new murders?
 The Plot of Russian Dolls: Ryuji Saki asks Kindaichi, Miyuki, and Kenmochi to help him solve a puzzle that leads to the inheritance of a famous mystery writer. But the puzzle deepens when the heirs start losing their heads... literally!  Usually, Kindaichi would have enough problems figuring out how the killer got into a locked room with the only key also locked away, but to make things worse, a figure from Kindaichi's past -— his nemesis, Takato -— returns with a bet: if Kindaichi finds the murderer first, he will let the killer face justice. Otherwise, Takato will allow the killer to continue his bloody work... then will execute him!  Can Kindaichi protect both the future victims and the murderer?
 Circus du Murder: Miyuki, Kindaichi, and his know-it-all cousin, Fumi, are invited by Kenmochi to join him and his wife Kazue at an inn located on a tropical island. There, they meet a circus troupe named the Goblin Circus, who live near the resort. When a storage room is found wrecked, along with mysterious gigantic footprints and a message on the wall that reads "MONSTER IS BACK", the troupe members are suspiciously quiet. However, some members have been secretly discussing a 2.3 m tall performer who disappeared a year ago, nicknamed "Monster". With the storm which prevents them from escaping the island and two clowns found dead, Kindaichi must find the culprit: is it really the "Monster", or someone else with an axe to grind?
 Judgment of Gankutsuō: Looking over a traveler's brochure, Kindaichi discovers that his old nemesis is in Hong Kong, and up to no good. Indeed, Takato's latest scheme involves assisting a murderer who calls himself the Gankutsuō ("The Count of Monte Cristo"). Ultimately, Takato manages to frame Kindaichi for the murders, just to prove he is the smarter man! Now, Kindaichi must prove his innocence by finding Gankutsuō, and make his nemesis pay for his crimes, once and for all!

NEW series

 Legendary Vampire Murders: A month after Kindaichi went on his bicycle riding vacation, he sends a letter to Miyuki, inviting her and Kenmochi to a themed inn named "Ruins", where one of their former classmates has a part-time job. The inn is located in a virtual ghost town due to rumors regarding vampirism that sprung up a few years past. The rumor comes to life when guests of the inn were found dead, their bodies drained of blood, with two puncture wounds on their necks—which appear to be vampire bites. Worse, the murders are impossible, unless the killer really is a vampire... or Miyuki Nanase...
 The Third Opera House Murders: Kindaichi, Miyuki, and Kenmochi return to the island Opera House Hotel for the third time (the second was detailed in the first of a series of Kindaichi novels by Seimaru Amagi), this time after the death of the hotel's owner, Kurosawa. The hotel and island has been bought by an old friend of Kurosawa, who wishes to honor his memory with a final performance of The Phantom of the Opera, before tearing the place down for good. Along with Kindaichi and gang, the new owner has invited members of Kurosawa's old theater troupe. However, tragedy strikes again when murders occur before the performance can take place.
 Gate of Jail Private School Murders: Back from his bicycle riding and applying for a top quality but extremely hellish school, Kindaichi once again encountered a murder on the day of his application exam... but Kindaichi kind of expected it. The exam site and the school itself were two of the locations on a "crime site tour" list compiled by his nemesis Takato — who, in his twisted mind, believed that these locations could be used to plan murder (thus Kindaichi's bike tour around Japan). To make it worse, Takato has recently escaped prison, and initiated his list of murder. Now, also sending the list to Akechi, Takato (disguised as an English teacher, unknown to them but revealed to readers) silently challenged them to figure out the common point among the murders and find his client... or is he planning something else for them? And lastly, is he going to make all the possible murder sites a reality?
 Spirit of the Snow Kindaichi Hajime was offered to receive a portion of a rich man's wealth as it written in his will. Seduced by money, Hajime along with Miyuki to the top of snowy mountain where all of the recipient of old man's wealth gathered. As Hajime discover more about the legend of a snow spirit, the recipients of the wealth begin to die one by one.
 Fudo High School Festival Murder Case Kindaichi attended a "maid café" hosted by the school's photo club only to discover a mysterious death. This case lasts only for four chapters, making this the shortest Kindaichi case (besides from the short stories) thus far.
 Chidamari's Murderer Kindaichi is forced to join "Go" club of his school.. by then, they go for a friendly match with a school. Then, one of the player has been killed at a place called "chidamari"- (the bottom of the Go board). Is it related to the legendary chidamari story? Kindaichi must find out who is the real culprit despite all the alibi they have. This short case has been published together with Fudo High School Festival Murder Case.
 The Black Magic Kindaichi's old friend from Karuizawa telling the truth behind the death of a company director, due to the curse of the puppet by using 'black magic'. Therefore, there's a tragedy lies behind the series of the black magic murders and the mask of the 'Puppet from Hell', Youichi Takatoo. Is it really a black magic murders, or just an illusionist murder?
 Murder Committed by Inspector Kenmochi Three delinquents who committed a murder a few years back were released from jail and attends the same school with Kindaichi. Due to Kenmochi's grudge towards them, the trio was targeted by an unknown killer, and Kenmochi became the suspect of the murders. Kindaichi knows that Kenmochi is not the killer and he must find out who the real killer is.
 The Alchemy Kindaichi joins the television game show and leads a group of television crew (including Reika Hayami the pop singer) and the participants to a deserted island, where an extremely intelligent physicist died. Then, one by one, the television crew was knock down by a masked killer who hold a huge weapon. Reika became the prime suspect of the case. This arc featured the main characters from Detective Academy Q which they make a cameo appearance, along with Saburomaru as the minor character, appearing only a few pages.
 House of Games Kindaichi and Miyuki take a ride after the festival for free of charge after realizing that he had overspend his cash. Then, suddenly he fall asleep. When he wake up, he found out that he was wearing a death mask (similar to the Saw reverse bear trap) along with Miyuki and a few other people who ride the bus. He found out that he and people in the basement required to play a deadly game, in order to survive until the end.

20TH ANNIVERSARY series
 Human Eater Research Institute Kindaichi and Miyuki were invited by their ex-classmate, teenage genius Midorigawa Mayu, to her deceased father's research institute, nicknamed the Man-eater Research Institute, to investigate the mystery behind a series of suicides of researchers. During their stay at the institute, visitors committed suicide one by one. However, Kindaichi believed that these incidents were in fact murder and promised to uncover the truth.
 Treasure in Kowloon, Hong Kong Miyuki was discovered by a modelling agency to participate in a fashion show in Hong Kong. Upon arrival, Miyuki was kidnapped and Kindaichi met a Hong Kong model, Lan Yeung, who looks exactly the same as Miyuki. The kidnap of Miyuki and the series of murders of VIPs at the fashion show seemed to point to the truth behind a local legendary gang leader, Emperor Dragon, and his hidden treasure, the Dragon Eye, in Hong Kong.
 Midnight Castle Kindaichi and Miyuki joined the Midnight Castle Tour to experience the life of blind people. In complete darkness, a murder happened.
 Mansion of Rosenkreuz Kindaichi's nemesis, Takato, sought help from Kindaichi after he received an invitation (also a threat letter) from an unknown person, Mr. Rosenkreuz, to the Mansion of Rosenkreuz, a mansion shaped as a Christian Cross and surrounded by a sea of roses. Guests gathered at the mansion to celebrate the successful cultivation of "the perfect Blue Rose," only to be murdered one by one.

R (RETURNS) Series
The Myth of the Snow Goblin A luxurious resort, Snow Goblin Skiing Resort, was looking for a new face for the brand. Miyuki was selected to be one of the potential girls, in replacement of her injured classmate. During Kindaichi and Miyuki's stay at the resort, one of the guests vanished without a trace. While people deemed it the attack of the mythical Snow Goblin, Kindaichi believed it was, in fact, murder.
The Haunted Academy Kindaichi and Miyuki set off to a deserted island, where 200 kg of gold was believed to be hidden in the ruins of an old school campus. They met Akechi and Kenmochi on the island, who were following traces of Takato. Meanwhile, three university students of the Ruins Investigation Club were murdered one by one. Was it the doing of Undead Headmaster, the wandering ghost of the haunted school, or was it another crime masterminded by Takato?
Fox-fire Murders Mystery Kindaichi reunited with 8 of his childhood friends at White Fox Village for the funeral of Tsukie Marie, who had recently been murdered and dressed as a fox spirit. As his friends were murdered one by one, Kindaichi vowed to discover the truth behind the murders.
College Student Akechi's Case Based on request of his old teacher in high school, Akechi agreed to investigate his senior Mikuni Rena who were troubled by something. In order to do that, he came to her college's festival where she became an announcer for her own campus radio. However, during the on-air broadcast someone was murdered and Akechi couldn't shake the feeling that his senior was involved, but how? This short series continues shortly after "Takato Case File", and this story shows the first meeting between Akechi and Kenmochi who was still Assistant Inspector at that time. 
Antlion's Nest Kindaichi and Miyuki were invited to participate in a 3-day color psychology research on a research institute designed like ant's nest in a remote desert by their reporter friend, Mr. Itsuki Yousuke. The research itself was puzzling enough, when all the subjects were dressed in and placed in rooms of different colors. The mystery thickened when two of the subjects were stabbed to death in the institute - nicknamed "Antlion Trench".
Bloodthirsty Cherry Blossom Kindaichi and Miyuki went on a trip to Yozakura Village for their Mysteries Club activity with the help of Ryuji Saki. Local folklore said that a doctor dismembered his patients and hid body parts under a cherry blossom tree, of which the flowers were unordinarily crimson red, hence its name "Blood-drinking Cherry Blossom". Visitors from different parts of the country gathered to view this famous blossom. Unfortunately, for some of them this was their last trip as they were murdered by an unknown killer.
Why was the fireplace burning at that moment? Itsuki Yousuke was called by a lover of his passing friend to be a mediator in an inheritance dispute. Behind the dispute, a threat letter was sent, signifying that something may happen during the discussion so Itsuki decide to take Kindaichi and Miyuki. Then, one of the member was found dead inside a locked cabin. Is it suicide, or a murder in a locked room? Why was the fireplace burning even though the weather was not cold? A short series. 
Island of the Dolls After solving the riddle on a mysterious letter upon the request of their social studies teacher, Ms. Shinobu Tokita, Kindaichi and Miyuki were invited to Hitogata Island, a.k.a. "The Island of the Dolls," to attend an annual ritual of doll worshiping. A popular group of masked novelists, namely the "Persona Dolls", were among the guests on the legendary island. The ghost of an ancient village chief was rumored to be haunting the place, but the true mystery was yet to be uncovered when the Persona Dolls were murdered and brutally dismembered one by one.
Akechi The Sommelier Among other talents he have, Akechi Kengo, chief superintendent of Tokyo Police headquarter is a capable sommelier! But when a murder happens in a wine meeting, will our Ace Superintendent be able to find the killer in the name of Dionysus, God of Grape and Wine? Short story.
Curse of Black Spirit Kindaichi was asked by Reika to help as a part-time worker in a film she stars at. He (and Miyuki who was obviously not jealous after accidentally saw the request) agreed to help. Unfortunately, the site, an old building of a hotel, was said to be haunted by a black shadow figure one of the crew saw not too log ago. To make things worse, the title of the film was "Black Spirit Hotel". The filming went just like scheduled up until one of the stars died from a falling chandelier. Semi-long story.
White Snake Brewing By Inspector Kenmochi's request, Kindaichi and Miyuki participated in Shirohebi Sake Brewing Tour owned by Shirakami family located in Hakuja Village, a village said to be blessed by White Snake God. The tour was meant to be an undercover investigation to look for a wanted serial murders who was hiding in the village. What awaited them there, however, was a series of murders in which the victims were wrapped in white froth shaped like white snake. Was it a curse or the fugitive's work?  
Siren's Lament As they entered the final round of Open-Sea Fishing Tournament, Kindaichi, Kenmochi and Miyuki went to Seiren Island, an island famous for its fishing spot along with three other groups. Unfortunately for them, the tournament had to be cancelled since one participant died before the competition even began. While the rest of them were trapped in the island, more people fell victim to Siren which has been singing in sorrow for those sacrificing their lives in the island, which used to be a Kamikaze attack training grounds.

37 Year Old Series

30TH Series

SHORT FILE series

The short cases of Kindaichi
 Murderous Intent of Below Freezing 15 Degrees
 Who Killed the Goddess?
 The Twin Murderer
 Christmas Eve Murder
 The Murder in the Mirror Labyrinth
 Fumi Kindaichi's Kidnapping
 The Adventure of Fumi Kindaichi
 Lost Ransom
 Alibi in the Film
 The Homicide Restaurant
 Homicide of the Blood Dyeing Pool
 Departed Spirit School Murder Case
 Puzzle of Instantaneous Disappearance
 The Challenge from Mysterious Gentlemen Thief
 Morning Sound of Gunshot at 4.40 am
 The Bee Poison Sword Murder Case
 The Strange Intrigue of the Female Doctor

See also
List of The Kindaichi Case Files light novels

References

External links
Weekly Shōnen Magazine official website 

Chapters
Kindaichi Case Files, The